Adam Forkner (born March 27, 1976) is a musician/producer.

Discography

As Airboy Express
 LAST STOP BREATH ART (2018)
 Acrylic Sleep Museum (2017)
 SUNWINTER (2017)

As White Rainbow
 ZOME (2005)
 BOX (2006)
 Sun Shifts (2007)
 Sky Drips Drifts (2007)
 Prism Of Eternal Now (2007)
 New Clouds (2009)
 THRU.U LP (2014)
 21 Exoticism ESCAP LP (2015)

As VVRSSNN
 VVRSSNN (2003)

With World
 s/t (2005)

With Yume Bitsu
 Giant Surface Music Falling to Earth Like Jewels From the Sky (1998)
 s/t (1999)
 Auspicious Winds (2000)
 split EP w/ Andrew Reiger (2002)
 The Golden Vessyl of Sound (2002)
 Dryystonian Dreamscapes (2002)
 Dryystonian Dreamscapes Volume II (2003)
 Wabi Morning (2003)

With Surface of Eceon/Surface of Eceyon
 The King Beneath the Mountain (2002)
 Dragyyn (2003)
 Tussyan Ruins (2003)
 Dragyyn (2004)

Other projects
 Clear Acrylic Thought Pattern podcast
 Rob Walmart - an improvised electronic music collective
 We Like Cats - a dub-influenced collaboration with Honey Owens (Miracles Club, Valet) and Eva Salens (Inca Ore) (Defunct)

Assault allegations
On February 18, 2016, Forkner's former girlfriend Christine Messersmith filed a report alleging that she and Forkner had been involved in a physical altercation three days earlier. According to LA Weekly, a Facebook post made my Messersmith asserted that “[Forkner] repeatedly beat me senseless”. Describing one of the alleged assaults, Messersmith wrote, “The attack lasted for 15 minutes; cornering me and smashing my face and body into objects and the floor, running from him from room to room until I was forced into my closet and called the police.” Accompanying her description of the attack, Messersmith posted photos of her black eyes and badly bruised body, injuries she says Forkner inflicted.
	
While Messersmith attempted to press charges against Forkner, the case was ultimately rejected by L.A. City Attorney's office due to “low likelihood of conviction based on the evidence”.
 	
As a result of Messersmith's allegations, several L.A. institutions, including Dublab radio, record label Leaving Records and the 2 Wet Crew comedy group, claimed to have cut ties with Forkner. Management at Dublab confirmed in an email to L.A. Weekly that Forkner had been dropped from the programming schedule; Leaving Records issued a Facebook post publicly announcing that its White Rainbow release had been removed from its catalog, though privately remained friends with Forkner.
 	
In an email to L.A. Weekly, 2 Wet Crew issued the following statement: “2 Wet Crew does not support domestic violence in any way and strives to make offbeat, lighthearted comedy. Any type of violence or abuse is the antithesis to our goals. Adam is no longer going to be associated with 2 Wet Crew (DJing preshow music or attending shows).”
 	
The Portland-based States Rights label also released a statement via Twitter saying it has removed past White Rainbow releases from its catalog. “Learning that somebody I've known and called a friend for close to 20 years is abusive to women is shocking, totally sickening (spiritually and physically), and heartbreaking,” the statement read in part. 
 	
Calvin Johnson, the head of K Records, another of Forkner’s former labels, initially tweeted support for the artist but later deleted the tweet. “It was wrong to show public support in any way to Adam. I deeply regret doing so,” Johnson tweeted to another user.

References

External links
 "Best New Bands" 2006 Willamette Week article
 "Best New Bands 2011" Willamette Week article
 Feature article on White Rainbow at treblezine.com
 Feature article on White Rainbow at thefader.com
 Interview with Forkner on Pitchforkmedia.com
 Adam Forkner Website (Adam Forkner website)
 Adam Forkner Accused of Domestic Assault at vice.com

Ambient musicians
Living people
1976 births
American electronic musicians
American experimental musicians
Dirty Projectors members
Jackie-O Motherfucker members